WOW 1999 is a compilation album of 30 contemporary Christian music hits that was released on October 20, 1998.  It also featured three bonus tracks from new artists.  WOW 1999 peaked at the 51st position on the Billboard 200 chart in 1998, and 2nd place on the Top Contemporary Christian album chart.  In 2000 it reached No. 21 on the Top Contemporary Christian chart.  The album was certified as double platinum in the year 2000 by the Recording Industry Association of America (RIAA).  It was certified as gold in Canada in 1999 by the Canadian Recording Industry Association.

Track listing

Green disc
"Into Jesus" – dc Talk
"Entertaining Angels" – Newsboys
"Crazy Times" – Jars of Clay
"Love Me Good" – Michael W. Smith
"Undo Me" – Jennifer Knapp
"Deeper" – Delirious?
"Pray" (Radio Edit) – Rebecca St. James
"The Devil Is Bad" – The W's
"If You Really Knew" – Out of Eden
"Agnus Dei" – Third Day
"Anything Genuine" – Smalltown Poets
"Little Man" – The O.C. Supertones
"Chevette" (Remix) – Audio Adrenaline
"What Would Jesus Do?" – Big Tent Revival
"His Cheeseburger" – VeggieTales
"To Know You" – Nichole Nordeman
"Hard To Get" - Rich Mullins [hidden track within previous track]

Silver disc
"Steady On" – Point of Grace
"God So Loved" – Jaci Velasquez
"Testify to Love" – Avalon
"I Will Not Go Quietly" – Steven Curtis Chapman
"Can't Get Past the Evidence" – 4Him
"Somewhere Down the Road" – Amy Grant
"Lord I Believe In You" (Remix) – Crystal Lewis
"That Where I Am, There You May Always Be" – Rich Mullins
"In the Hands of Jesus" – Bob Carlisle
"Healing Waters" – Michelle Tumes
"The Power of a Moment" – Chris Rice
"He Will Make a Way" – Kathy Troccoli
"Strollin' On the Water" – Bryan Duncan
"Never Be" – Carman
"The Light on the Hill" – Máire Brennan
"There Is a God" – Natalie Grant
"Lord of Eternity" – Fernando Ortega

References

External links 
 WOW Hits online

1998 compilation albums
1999